Pandanus kajui is a species of flowering plant in the family Pandanaceae. It is endemic to Kenya.

References

kajui
Endemic flora of Kenya
Vulnerable flora of Africa
Taxonomy articles created by Polbot
Taxa named by Henk Jaap Beentje